Zoho Corporation is an Indian multinational technology company that makes computer software and web-based business tools. It is best known for the online office suite offering Zoho Office Suite. The company was founded in 1996 by Sridhar Vembu and Tony Thomas and has a presence in seven locations with global headquarters in Chennai, Tamil Nadu, India, and corporate headquarters outside of Austin in Del Valle, Texas. Radha Vembu, Sridhar Vembu's sister, owns a majority stake in the company.

History
From 1996 to 2009, the company was known as AdventNet, Inc. and initially provided network management software.

AdventNet expanded operations into Japan in 2001 and shifted focus to small and medium businesses (SMBs). 

Zoho CRM was released in 2005, along with Zoho Writer, the company's first Office suite product. Zoho Projects, Creator, Sheet, and Show were released in 2006. Zoho expanded into the collaboration space with the release of Zoho Docs and Zoho Meeting in 2007. In 2008, the company added invoicing and mail applications, reaching one million users by August of that year.

In 2009, the company was renamed Zoho Corporation after its online office suite. The company remains privately owned.

In 2017, Zoho launched Zoho One, a comprehensive suite of over forty applications. As of October 2021, Zoho One has been expanded to 50 applications. The following year, in November 2022, Zoho worked with more than 50,000 organizations in more than 160 countries.

Zoho reached more than 50 million customers in January 2020. In July 2022, the company announced it had more than 80 million users.

Zoholics India is the name of the company's annual user conference.

Other products include Zoho Books, an accounting software, Zoho Workplace, an enterprise collaboration platform, Zoho Survey, a customer experience management tool, and Zoho People, an HR management platform.

Locations
Zoho is headquartered in Chennai, India. As of 2021, it has 12 offices operating in nine countries around the world. The company operates in China and also has offices in Singapore and Japan. The bulk of its support operations are carried out from its office in Chennai. Zoho also has an office in Renigunta, Andhra Pradesh and has been operating from this office since 2018.

Its US headquarters was in Pleasanton, California until it was moved to Del Valle, Texas in 2019. In April 2019, Zoho purchased the land outside of Austin that was intended for their new headquarters. Instead, in February 2020, they built an organic farm as a food source and place for rest and recreation for its employees during the COVID-19 pandemic. There, employees work out of existing structures. Unused food is shared with the Central Texas Food Bank and other organizations.

The research and development campus is in Estancia IT Park, Chennai. Zoho opened an office in Tenkasi in 2011, where their product Zoho Desk was built and launched.

After the outbreak of COVID-19 Zoho planned to open branches in rural areas in southern Tamil Nadu including Madurai and Theni. In February 2022, Zoho opened an office in New Braunfels, Texas, United States. In July of that year, that location had 30 employees.

In April 2022, Zoho opened an office in McAllen, Texas in the Rio Grande Valley, the company's third location in Texas. In July 2022, the company announced plans to open an office in Lagos, Nigeria, its third African office.

See also
Arattai (Instant messaging app from Zoho Corporation)

References

Further reading

External links

Companies based in Chennai
Software companies established in 1996
Indian companies established in 1996
Customer relationship management software companies
Privately held companies of India
Software companies of India
1996 establishments in Tamil Nadu